Seth Blattman is an American politician and Democratic member of the Arizona House of Representatives elected to represent District 9 in 2022.

Early life & education
Blattman moved to Scottsdale, Arizona as a child with his family, and later attended the University of Arizona and graduated from Arizona State University, where he received his Bachelor's degree in political science. He also received his MBA from the University of California, Los Angeles. After, he worked for his family's furniture business. He is Jewish.

Elections
2022 Blattman and Lorena Austin were unchallenged in the Democratic Primary, and they went on to defeat Republican nominees Kathy Pearce and Mary Ann Mendoza in the general election.

References

External links
 Biography at Ballotpedia

Democratic Party members of the Arizona House of Representatives
Living people
Year of birth missing (living people)
21st-century American politicians
Politicians from Mesa, Arizona
Arizona State University alumni
University of California, Los Angeles alumni
Politicians from Scottsdale, Arizona
Jewish American state legislators in Arizona
21st-century American Jews